Georg Kuttner (born 23 February 1968) is an Austrian former bobsledder. He competed in the four man event at the 1998 Winter Olympics.

References

External links
 

1968 births
Living people
Austrian male bobsledders
Olympic bobsledders of Austria
Bobsledders at the 1998 Winter Olympics
People from Spittal an der Drau District
Sportspeople from Carinthia (state)